Ardıç can refer to:

 Ardıç, Gercüş
 Ardıç, Osmancık